Henry Souza (12 July 1921 – 8 May 1975) was a Hong Kong sports shooter. He competed at the 1960 Summer Olympics, the 1964 Summer Olympics and 1958 and 1966 Asian Games.

References

1921 births
1975 deaths
Hong Kong male sport shooters
Olympic shooters of Hong Kong
Shooters at the 1960 Summer Olympics
Shooters at the 1964 Summer Olympics
Asian Games medalists in shooting
Shooters at the 1958 Asian Games
Shooters at the 1966 Asian Games
Hong Kong emigrants to Canada
Asian Games bronze medalists for Hong Kong
Medalists at the 1958 Asian Games
20th-century Hong Kong people